Dallas Cairns (1883-1941) was an Australian actor and director of the silent film era.

His stage roles included in the original Broadway production of Bernard Shaw's Pygmalion with Mrs Patrick Campbell, in 1914.

He was born in Frederick Dallas Cairns in Melbourne, Australia and died in London, England, UK.

Selected filmography

References

External links
 
 

1883 births
1941 deaths
Australian male stage actors
Australian male silent film actors
Male actors from Melbourne
20th-century Australian male actors